The Corinda landslip was a substantial landslip event on a hill on the southern end of the Brisbane suburb of Corinda during the 1974 Brisbane flood.

Causes
Hayne et al. describe landslips associated with landsliding at Corinda as being the result of "excessive clearing and excessive pore pressure following heaving rain", with the rain being the heavy rain associated with the rainfall event of 25–28 January 1974, when Tropical Cyclone Wanda dropped 1,000 mm of rain. Geoscience Australia indicated that the landslide was due to "increased pore water pressure, unfavourably inclined weak sedimentary rocks […] and lack of adequate surface drainage".

Extent
The Corinda landslip struck Cliveden Avenue, Oxley Terrace and Strathburn Street, located at the southern edge of the suburb of Corinda and extending into the neighbouring suburb of Oxley. The landslides in Corinda and surrounding suburbs involved "thousands of tonnes" of soil, with a section of Cliveden Avenue eventually being permanently closed to vehicular traffic. It was difficult to visualise any remedial measure that would provide a permanent, effective solution. At Cliveden Ave, there was movement of 30–100 mm per day on a slide 10 m deep". Land slid both onto Oxley Terrace and onto Cliveden Avenue. Several houses were demolished because "remedial measures were considered uneconomic".

Reaction
Alderman Gordon Thompson, a local politician for the Brisbane City Council, declared at the time that, within the landslip area, "land that was being sold for homesites should never have gone on the market for that use".

Future risks
Granger and Hayne have indicated that the rainfall event which triggered the landslip was a "rainfall event with an annual recurrence of around 100 years", and they also warn that "[d]isasters like the Thredbo landslide should serve to remind us of landslip risk". Similarly, Hayne et al. indicate that such landslips are "likely to happen again". The 2011 Brisbane Flood Flag Map indicates that areas adjacent to the Corinda landslip are prone to flooding in the future, and the CSIRO has warned that, with global warming, extreme weather events such as the rainfall event which triggered the 1974 Corinda landslip are likely to become more frequent.

References

Corinda, Queensland
Landslides in Australia
1974 in Australia
History of Brisbane
Disasters in Brisbane
Landslides in 1974